Atomic City may refer to:

Places
Atomic City, Idaho, a city in Bingham County, Idaho
Oak Ridge, Tennessee, a city in Anderson and Roane Counties, Tennessee
A nickname for Las Vegas earned in the 1950s when it was the site of above-ground nuclear weapons testing.
A nickname for Piqua, Ohio, from it having the first municipal nuclear power plant
Nilore, Islamabad, Nilore nicknamed "Northern Atomic City" hosted an apex scientific research in the 1960s led under Abdus Salam in Pakistan and it was established in 1960's as a research site for nuclear technology.

Entertainment
"Atomic City" (song), a song by Holly Johnson
The Atomic City, a 1952 film
"Atomic City", a 2016 episode of Timeless (TV series)

See also

 Atomic (disambiguation)
 City (disambiguation)